Sidalcea oregana is a species of flowering plant in the mallow family known by the common name Oregon checkerbloom.

Distribution
It is native to western North America from British Columbia to California to Utah, where it grows in a number of moist habitat types, such as marshes and meadows. The plant is somewhat variable in appearance, and the species is divided into a few subspecies; some authors also recognize varieties within subspecies. In general, this is a perennial herb growing to maximum heights well over one meter from a woody taproot.

Description
Sidalcea oregana is usually hairy in texture, the hairs thick and bristly toward the base of the stem. Most of the leaves are located low on the stem, basal or on long petioles. Their blades are usually deeply divided into lobes (see image at left); upper leaves may be divided further into leaflets.

The inflorescence is a dense or open spikelike raceme of many flowers. Each flower has five pink petals up to 2 centimeters long, usually notched at the end, and a central tube of reproductive parts (see flower closeup image).

Subspecies
Subspecies include:
Sidalcea oregana var. calva — Wenatchee Mountains checkermallow, endemic to the Wenatchee Mountains of Washington and a federally listed Endangered species.
Sidalcea oregana ssp. eximia — coast checkerbloom, endemic to ~10 populations in northwestern California, a Critically endangered species on the California Native Plant Society Inventory of Rare and Endangered Plants.
Sidalcea oregana ssp. hydrophila
Sidalcea oregana ssp. oregana
Sidalcea oregana ssp. spicata — spicate checkerbloom or bog mallow, widespread in meadows or streamsides of the Sierra and Cascades in California, below . 
Sidalcea oregana ssp. valida — Kenwood Marsh checkerbloom, known only from two marshes in Sonoma County, California, a federal, state, and CNPS listed endangered species.

Ecology
It is a larval host to the West Coast lady.

References

External links
Calflora Database: Sidalcea oregana (Oregon checker mallow,  Oregon checkerbloom)
Jepson Manual eFlora (TJM2) treatment of Sidalcea oregana
USDA Plants Profile for Sidalcea oregana
Washington Burke Museum
UC CalPhotos gallery: Sidalcea oregana

oregana
Flora of the Northwestern United States
Flora of California
Flora of Nevada
Flora of Oregon
Flora of Utah
Flora of the Cascade Range
Flora of the Klamath Mountains
Flora of the Sierra Nevada (United States)
Natural history of the California chaparral and woodlands
Natural history of the California Coast Ranges
Flora without expected TNC conservation status